The White Bluff Formation is a marl, sand, and clay geologic formation in Arkansas that is part of the Jackson Group. It preserves fossils dating back to the Paleogene period, specifically the Eocene.

Description 
The White Bluff Formation is composed of three members: the Pastoria Sand Member, the Caney Point Marl Member, and the Rison Clay Member. The Pastoria Sand is a clayey sand containing glauconite and mollusca fossils. The Caney Point Marl is a chalky clay with glauconite and various invertebrate fossils. The Rison Clay is a clay with interbedded silts containing foraminifera fossils and scattered mollusca molds. The entire formation was deposited as a marine sequence.

See also 

 List of fossiliferous stratigraphic units in Arkansas
 Paleontology in Arkansas

References 

 

Paleogene Arkansas